Africa Films is an Egyptian production company established in 2019 by Sherif El Bendary.

Filmography
 Sunday at Five (2019), directed by Sherif El Bendary
 Africa (2020), in pre-production, directed by Sherif El Bendary
 The Picture that Salma Drew (2020), in development, directed by Morad Mostafa
 Spray (2020), in development, directed by Sherif El Bendary

References

External links 
 Africa Films at the Internet Movie Database
 Africa Films on Twitter

Film production companies of Egypt